SMK Bukit Kepayang, Seremban 2 is a day school in Seremban District, Negeri Sembilan, Malaysia. The enrollment of students is controlled by the State Education Department of Negeri Sembilan.

References 
1. http://www.smkbk.net/

Schools in Negeri Sembilan
Seremban District

Secondary schools in Malaysia